Scott Edmund Stahoviak (born March 6, 1970) is a former Minnesota Twins first baseman. He attended Creighton University, and was an integral part of Creighton's NCAA College World Series appearance in 1991.  He batted left-handed and threw right-handed.

Stahoviak was drafted by the Twins in the first round (27th overall) in the 1991 amateur draft.  He signed with the Twins on June 13, 1991.  He made his major league debut in 1993 and also played from 1995 through 1998.  Stahoviak played at least part of every season in the minor leagues from  until  except . His last two seasons were spent in the Chicago Cubs organization.

He used to be a gym teacher at Saint Norbert School in Northbrook, IL. He now teaches Physical Education at Maple Middle School in Northbrook, IL.

External links

1970 births
Living people
All-American college baseball players
Baseball players from Illinois
Creighton Bluejays baseball players
Iowa Cubs players
Major League Baseball first basemen
Minnesota Twins players
Nashville Xpress players
Salt Lake Buzz players
Visalia Oaks players
Sportspeople from Waukegan, Illinois